Alexander Lindsay "Alec" Hosie (6 August 1890 – 11 June 1957) was an English first-class cricketer who played for a large number of teams in England and India. Hosie was a right-handed batsman who bowled occasional right-arm medium pace.

Childhood
Hosie was the only son of the British diplomat and China expert Sir Alexander Hosie and his first wife, the former Florence Lindsay. He was born in Wenzhou in China and educated in England at St Lawrence College, Ramsgate, and Magdalen College, Oxford.

Cricket career
Hosie made his first-class cricket debut for Oxford University in 1913 against Kent. He represented the university in five first-class matches in 1913, scoring two half-centuries with a highest score of 60 against the Marylebone Cricket Club.

In 1913, Hosie also played for Hampshire against Yorkshire. Hosie represented the club in three first-class matches before the First World War and 77 more times from 1921 to 1935. He played infrequently for Hampshire, having to manage his commitments in India. In his 77 matches for Hampshire, he scored 3,542 runs at an average of 26.83, with 17 half-centuries, 5 centuries and a high score of 155 against Yorkshire in 1928.

In 1921 Hosie made his debut for the Europeans (India) against the Hindus. Hosie represented the Europeans in 14 first-class matches from 1921 to 1929. Hosie scored 921 runs for them at an average of 38.37, with five half centuries, two centuries and a career-high score of 200 against the Hindus in 1924.

1925 saw Hosie make his debut for the Marylebone Cricket Club against Cambridge University. Hosie played seven first-class matches for MCC from 1925 to 1938. In his seven matches for the club, he scored 287 runs at an average of 22.07, with a single half century score 63.

In 1935 Hosie made his debut for Bengal against the touring Australians. He played eight first-class matches for Bengal between 1935 and 1937, scoring 449 runs at an average of 32.07, with five half centuries and a high score of 82 against Central Provinces and Berar in 1936.

As well as playing first-class cricket for the above teams, Hosie also played first-class cricket for Bengal Governor's XI, MC Bird's XI, Free Foresters, Europeans and Parsees, Europeans in the East, India, the Gentlemen, South of England, the Viceroy's XI, the Rest of India, an Indian XI, Indian University Occasionals and Lord Tennyson's XI.

Death
Hosie died at Ashurst, Hampshire, in June 1957 aged 66.

References

External links

1890 births
1957 deaths
Sportspeople from Wenzhou
Hampshire cricketers
Gentlemen cricketers
Marylebone Cricket Club cricketers
Free Foresters cricketers
North v South cricketers
Bengal cricketers
People educated at St Lawrence College, Ramsgate
Alumni of Magdalen College, Oxford
Oxford University cricketers
English cricketers
Europeans cricketers
English cricketers of 1919 to 1945
L. H. Tennyson's XI cricket team
Viceroy's XI cricketers